Myrmecia fuscipes is an Australian ant which belongs to the genus Myrmecia. This species is native to Australia. Their distribution is heavily observed in South Australia and Western Australia.

The average size of a worker ant is 20-21 millimetres in length. The head and gaster are black, the antennae, thorax, node, and other features are a yellowish-red colour. Mandibles are yellow, and the anterior legs are light brown, and the middle and posterior pair is dark brown. It can also range to an almost black like colour in some cases.

References

External links

Myrmeciinae
Hymenoptera of Australia
Insects described in 1951